Carl Jessen may refer to:

 Carl Ludwig Jessen (1833–1917), North Frisian painter
 Carl Wilhelm Jessen (1764–1823), Danish naval officer and governor of St Thomas